Bideh is a bidrah in Padena-ye Olya Rural District, Padena District, Semirom County, Isfahan Province, Iran. At the 2006 census, its population was 1,245, in 297 families. This name derived from the words Bid (willow tree that is abundant in this village) and Deh (village).

References 

http://commons.wikimedia.org/wiki/File:Aks-_(28).JPG

Populated places in Semirom County